The Torah Academy is a Chabad Jewish day school in Johannesburg, South Africa. It comprises a boys' high school, a girls' high school (on a separate campus), a primary school and a nursery school. The Mission of the school is to "provide and promote the highest quality Jewish and general education to a diverse community of Jewish children... [and] to cultivate students to reach personal excellence, and to be responsible members of society." Although the school is Chassidic Orthodox, families of all levels of observance are welcomed.

The school provides a Kodesh (Jewish Studies) curriculum "combined with a strong secular studies program within a single framework." Kodesh studies comprise Torah (Chumash, Navi, Mishna and Talmud), Halacha (Jewish law), Hebrew language, and Jewish History; at the Boy's High School, studies are within a Mesivta environment.  The secular program follows the national and provincial standards, and students are fully prepared for writing "Matric"; pass rate are generally very high, and students often achieve competitively in these exams.

On campus there is also "Lubavitch House", which contains the offices of the dean and administrator, with boardrooms, a printing room, and a dining room and kitchen. The Torah Academy Shul, serving the (Chabad) community in that area of Johannesburg, is also on campus.

See also
Jewish education in South Africa under History of the Jews in South Africa
Lubavitch Yeshiva Gedolah of Johannesburg

References

External links
 Torah Academy School Website
 chabad.org Listing

Orthodox yeshivas in South Africa
Chabad schools
Schools in Johannesburg
Jews and Judaism in Johannesburg
Private schools in Gauteng
Jewish schools in South Africa